The Raleigh Boychoir is a 70-member choral group based in Raleigh, North Carolina, that trains elementary and high school-aged boys in singing and performing choral music in the tradition of "boychoir".

History 

The Raleigh Boychoir was established in October 1968 by Thomas E. Sibley with 20 boys and a $50 contribution from the Woman's Club of Raleigh. Sibley, who served as coordinator of music for Raleigh public schools, as well as organist and choirmaster of Holy Trinity Lutheran Church in Raleigh, founded the choir because he was concerned about the lack of choral experiences and performance opportunities for boys whose voices had not changed. He also believed in developing the etiquette of young boys.

The newly formed boychoir offered a public concert during its first Christmas season in 1968. That first "Carols of Christmas" concert has become a Yuletide tradition for many in the greater Raleigh area. Mr. Sibley conducted his 40th and final holiday concert in 2008.

Among the alumni of the boychoir is professional singer Clay Aiken.

Repertoire 

The Boychoir is committed both to artistic excellence and to developing each boy's confidence and character. The Raleigh Boychoir’s repertoire includes sacred and secular classics, selections from musical theater, and a rich assortment of American folk music and patriotic music.

The Raleigh Boychoir has performed at the White House, Carnegie Hall and the National Cathedral, and has toured throughout the United States and Europe. The Raleigh Boychoir is composed of the following choirs:

Some Raleigh Boychoir choristers have moved on to other top boychoirs around the world, including the American Boychoir, St. Thomas Choir of Men and Boys and the Vienna Boys' Choir.

Annual Performance Schedule 

The performance schedule has expanded from a single Christmas concert in 1968 to 15-20 engagements annually. The various Raleigh Boychoir choirs sing throughout the greater Raleigh area. Members of the Performing Choir and Young Men's Ensemble are selected for the Tour Choir, which takes trips regionally, nationally and internationally. The most recent international trip was a 2016 tour of the Republic of Ireland and Northern Ireland.

The Boychoir's annual home season consists of four key performances: Fall Concert, Carols of Christmas, American Music Festival and Spring Concert. The schedule also includes engagements that range from participation in the Friends of the College and Peace Concert Series to concerts for arts and civic organizations, from outreach performances at retirement communities to concerts in conjunction with the family-oriented events at the North Carolina Museum of Art, and from festivals and celebrations for the city of Raleigh and towns in Wake County to performances with the North Carolina Symphony and the North Carolina Master Chorale.

Musical Education and Personal Development 

In addition providing performance opportunities, the Raleigh Boychoir provides musical training for every choir member. Choristers develop an appreciation for a wide range of choral literature. They also learn to read and sight-read/sight-sing music. These skills are beneficial to boys who also play instruments or sing in school or church choirs.

Participating in the Raleigh Boychoir also affords choristers the opportunity to develop confidence, poise, character, discipline and leadership abilities. Each chorister devotes numerous hours over weeks, months and years to help sustain the choral tradition of boychoir singing. In return, choristers are rewarded with a rich, unique and unforgettable experience that will remain an integral part of their lives.

Auditions 

The Raleigh Boychoir holds auditions several times per year. Interested boys and their parents come to the Raleigh Boychoir Center to learn more about the choir and meet with the artistic directors. This audition is low key; boys simply need to bring with them a love of music and a desire to sing. Auditions are open to school-aged boys, regardless of race, color, or creed. New boys are allowed to participate in a trial period of a month before committing to a semester-based tuition.

Artistic Staff 

 Jeremy Tucker, Artistic Director, Conductor, Performing Choir, Tour Choir, Young Men's Ensemble and Alumni Choir
 Vicki Oehling, Training Choir Conductor and Principal Accompanist Emeritus
 Danny Yancey, Resident Choir Conductor
 Megan Yohman, Principal Accompanist
 Thomas Sibley, Founding Director Emeritus

References

External links 
 Raleigh Boychoir Homepage

Choirs of children
Musical groups from Raleigh, North Carolina
Musical groups established in 1968
American choirs